Valentine Max Jeffery  (6 December 1934 – 18 July 2017) was an Australian politician.

Jeffery was elected to the Australian Capital Territory Legislative Assembly as a Liberal member for Brindabella on 28 July 2016, following a countback resulting from Brendan Smyth's resignation. He was the owner of the Tharwa general store, and had run as a Liberal candidate at the 2012 ACT election (and previously at the 2008 election for The Community Alliance Party). At the age of 81, he is the oldest person to have sat in the Assembly, and did not re-contest his seat at the 2016 election held in October, with his term lasting just over two weeks and six assembly sittings. He died on 18 July 2017 at the age of 82.

References

1934 births
2017 deaths
Liberal Party of Australia members of the Australian Capital Territory Legislative Assembly
Members of the Australian Capital Territory Legislative Assembly
Recipients of the Australian Fire Service Medal
Recipients of the Medal of the Order of Australia
21st-century Australian politicians